Sania Mirza and Shahar Pe'er were the defending champions. They were both present but did not compete together.
Mirza partnered with Anna Chakvetadze, but lost in the first round to Eva Hrdinová and Vladimíra Uhlířová.
Peer partnered with Gisela Dulko, but lost in the first round to Ayumi Morita and Ai Sugiyama.

Cara Black and Liezel Huber won in the final 6–4, 6–3, against Elena Vesnina and Vera Zvonareva.

Seeds

Draw

Draw

External links
 Draw

Doubles
Bank of the West Classic